Matt Reiswerg (born July 3, 1980) is an American former soccer (football) player and coach. Currently, he is the Development Academy Coordinator for the United States Soccer Federation. He played soccer at Indiana University. He played professionally for the Cincinnati Riverhawks, and the Indiana Blast. He won a silver medal with Team USA at the 2005 Maccabiah Games in Israel.

Early life
Reiswerg is a son of trial attorney Jacob Reiswerg and Susan Caras Reiswerg, a native of Indianapolis, Indiana, lived in Carmel, Indiana, and attended North Central High School. His grandfather was Rube Reiswerg, a professional basketball player in the National Basketball League during the 1930s.

Career

College
Reiswerg attended Indiana University (Psychology; '02), where he was a goalkeeper on the Hoosiers soccer team from 1999 to 2002. He was a member of Indiana University's 1999 NCAA National Championship team, as well as a part of three IU squads that advanced to the College Cup Final Four. Additionally, the Hoosiers captured four Big Ten regular season titles, and two Big Ten Tournament championships during his playing career. Reiswerg was a 4-time Alpha Beta Academic Award honoree during his career.

Professional
In April 2003, Reiswerg signed a professional contract with the Cincinnati Riverhawks of the USL A-League, the second-highest professional league in the U.S., below MLS. Reiswerg appeared in 6 games that season for the Riverhawks, starting 5. He made his professional debut for Cincinnati on May 2, 2003, when he came on as a substitute in the Riverhawks' 3–0 victory over the Indiana Blast. In his first professional start, Reiswerg recorded 12 saves in a 3–0 shutout victory over the El Paso Patriots on May 10. For his efforts, Reiswerg was named to the USL A-League Team of the Week. Reiswerg won his second start against the Blast, 2–1, in his home city of Indianapolis, on May 16. Reiswerg also started the Riverhawks' 2nd round U.S. Open Cup match against the Minnesota Thunder, a 2–1 overtime defeat.

In July 2003, Reiswerg left the Riverhawks and signed with his hometown Indiana Blast. He started 2 matches for the Blast in 2003. In the final game of the 2003 season - which would be the Blast's final match as an A-League professional franchise - Reiswerg started in goal and shut out the defending league champions and 2003 regular season champions, Milwaukee Wave, for 45 minutes before being substituted.

International
Reiswerg represented the United States as the starting goalkeeper for three international Maccabiah competitions, culminating in the 2005 Maccabiah Games in Israel. At the 2005 games, Reiswerg recorded shutouts in 3 of his first 4 games, which included a penalty shootout victory over Mexico in the semifinals following a 0–0 draw. After blanking Mexico for 120 minutes, Reiswerg saved a potentially game-winning penalty kick on Mexico's 5th spot-kick. Then in sudden-death penalties, he again made a save and then watched his team convert their attempt to seal the victory. The dramatic win advanced the Americans to the tournament final vs. Israel. The United States team lost 2–0 to Israel's U-20 National Team in the final, and won the silver medal.

Coaching and administration
Reiswerg was an Assistant Coach for the IUPUI Jaguars men's soccer team for five seasons, from 2006–10. His primary duty was training the goalkeepers. The Jaguars advanced to the Summit League tournament in each of his five seasons at IUPUI, and were finalists in 2007. Under Reiswerg's watch in 2009, the team's goalkeepers posted the lowest team goals against average, and highest save percentage since IUPUI's NCAA Tournament team in 2000. In 2010, the Jaguars keepers bested their 2009 goals against average - recording a combined 1.06 GAA.

In 2012 Reiswerg assisted Coach Shek Borkowski on the staff of the Haitian Women's National Team, and oversaw the training of the goalkeepers during their residency in Lafayette, Indiana. In November 2012, Reiswerg was hired as the Director of Operations and Marketing for the United Soccer Alliance of Indiana, the state's largest youth soccer organization. 

Reiswerg was hired as Development Academy Manager by U.S. Soccer in March 2015, to join the staff of the U.S. Soccer Development Academy, a program that provides education, resources, and support to impact everyday club environments to develop world-class players. He oversees Development Academy league scheduling and operations, and collaborates to execute Development Academy Showcases and Championship events.

Honors

Indiana University
NCAA Men's Division I Soccer Championship (1): 1999 NCAA National Champions

A-League
USL A-League Team of the Week (1): 2003, Week 5, while playing for the Cincinnati Riverhawks

Maccabiah Games
2005 Maccabiah Games (1): silver medal

References

1980 births
Living people
Competitors at the 2005 Maccabiah Games
Jewish American sportspeople
Jewish footballers
American soccer players
Maccabiah Games medalists in football
Maccabiah Games silver medalists for the United States
People from Carmel, Indiana
Soccer players from Indianapolis
Soccer players from Indiana
USL First Division players
Cincinnati Riverhawks players
Indiana Blast players
Indiana Hoosiers men's soccer players
Association football goalkeepers
IUPUI Jaguars men's soccer
College men's soccer coaches in the United States
Association football goalkeeping coaches
21st-century American Jews